Gennaro D'Alessandro (1717? – after 28 July 1778) was an Italian Baroque composer and harpsichordist.

References

External links 

1717 births
Date of birth uncertain
Year of death uncertain
Italian harpsichordists
Italian Baroque composers
18th-century Italian composers
18th-century Italian male musicians
Place of birth missing
Place of death missing